USS Octopus may refer to:

USS Octopus (SS-9), a United States Navy submarine in commission from 1908 to 1919 and renamed  in 1911
USS Octopus, a fictional World War II United States Navy submarine in Edward L. Beachs 1955 novel Run Silent, Run Deep

United States Navy ship names